Calisto confusa is a butterfly of the family Nymphalidae. It is endemic to Hispaniola, where it is mainly found in the lowlands.

The larvae feed on various grasses.

References

Butterflies described in 1899
Calisto (butterfly)
Butterflies of the Caribbean